Saperda simulans is a species of beetle in the family Cerambycidae. It was described by Charles Joseph Gahan in 1888. It is known from China.

References

simulans
Beetles described in 1888